"First Law" is a science fiction story by Isaac Asimov.

First law may also refer to:

 Newton's first law of motion
 First law of thermodynamics
 Mendel's first law of segregation

See also 
 Second law (disambiguation)
 Third law (disambiguation)
 The First Law, a fantasy series by Joe Abercrombie
 The First Law (film), a 1918 silent film